Sir Thomas  Trenchard (1582 – 1657) was an English politician who sat in the House of Commons at various times between 1621 and 1648.

Trenchard was the son of Sir George Trenchard of Warmwell and his wife Ann Speke daughter of Sir George Speke of Whitelackington. He was knighted at Theobalds on 15 December 1613. He was appointed High Sheriff of Dorset in 1634.

In 1621, Trenchard was elected Member of Parliament for Dorset. In April 1640, he was elected MP for Bridport in the Short Parliament. In 1645, he was re-elected MP for Dorset for the Long Parliament and sat until 1648 when he was excluded under Pride's Purge.
 
Trenchard married Elizabeth Morgan. He had a son Thomas who was the father of John Trenchard Secretary of State.

References

 

 

1582 births
1657 deaths
People from Bridport
High Sheriffs of Dorset
English MPs 1621–1622
English MPs 1640 (April)
English MPs 1640–1648